The 36th American Society of Cinematographers Awards were held on March 20, 2022, honoring the best cinematographers of film and television in 2021. The nominees were announced on January 25, 2022.

Winners and nominees

Film
Winners listed first and in bold.

Television

References

2021
2021 film awards
2021 television awards
American
2021 in American cinema